Lectionary 289, designated by siglum ℓ 289 (in the Gregory-Aland numbering) is a Greek manuscript of the New Testament, on parchment. Palaeographically it has been assigned to the 14th century.
Frederick Henry Ambrose Scrivener labelled it as 168e.

Some leaves of the manuscript were lost.

Description 

The codex contains lessons from the Gospels of Matthew and Luke (Evangelistarium), on 156 parchment leaves, with some lacunae.
Lessons from the Gospel of John and major part of Menology were lost.

The text is written in Greek minuscule letters, in two columns per page, 27-28 lines per page. The manuscript contains weekday Gospel lessons.

History 

Scrivener and Gregory dated the manuscript to the 14th century. It has been assigned by the Institute for New Testament Textual Research (INTF) to the 14th century.

The manuscript was added to the list of New Testament manuscripts by Scrivener (number 168e) and Gregory (number 289e). Gregory saw the manuscript in 1886.

The manuscript is not cited in the critical editions of the Greek New Testament (UBS3).

The codex is housed at the Biblioteca Ambrosiana (C. 160 inf.) in Milan.

See also 

 List of New Testament lectionaries
 Biblical manuscript
 Textual criticism
 Lectionary 288

Notes and references

Bibliography 

 

Greek New Testament lectionaries
14th-century biblical manuscripts
Manuscripts of the Ambrosiana collections